Shiyan Wudangshan Airport  is an airport serving the city of Shiyan in northwestern Hubei Province, China. The airport cost 1.635 billion yuan to build, and it opened on 5 February 2016, when its inaugural flight arrived from Hangzhou Xiaoshan International Airport.

Facilities
The airport has a  runway, which can handle Boeing 737-800 and Airbus A320 aircraft. It covers an area of 2800.5 mu.

Airlines and destinations

See also
List of airports in China
List of the busiest airports in China

References

Airports in Hubei
Airports established in 2016
2016 establishments in China